Eublemma baccalix is a species of moth of the family Erebidae first described by Charles Swinhoe in 1886. It is endemic to the Canary Islands but can sometimes be found in Sri Lanka and the Madhya Pradesh state of India, to which it migrates.

References

Moths described in 1886
Endemic fauna of the Canary Islands
Boletobiinae
Moths of Cape Verde
Moths of Asia
Moths of Japan
Moths of Africa
Moths of Réunion
Moths of the Middle East